Aldehyde dehydrogenase 1 family, member A2, also known as ALDH1A2 or retinaldehyde dehydrogenase 2 (RALDH2), is an enzyme that in humans is encoded by the ALDH1A2 gene.

This protein belongs to the aldehyde dehydrogenase family of proteins. The product of this gene is an enzyme that catalyzes the synthesis of retinoic acid (RA) from retinaldehyde. Retinoic acid, the active derivative of vitamin A (retinol), is a paracrine hormone signaling molecule that functions in developing and adult tissues. The studies of a similar mouse gene suggest that this enzyme and the cytochrome CYP26A1, concurrently establish local embryonic retinoic acid levels that facilitate posterior organ development and prevent spina bifida. Three transcript variants encoding distinct isoforms have been identified for this gene.

References

External links

Further reading